Vladimír Kejř (20 January 1929 – 9 May 1981) was a Czech gymnast. He competed at the 1952 Summer Olympics and the 1956 Summer Olympics.

References

External links
 

1929 births
1981 deaths
People from Úvaly
Czech male artistic gymnasts
Olympic gymnasts of Czechoslovakia
Gymnasts at the 1952 Summer Olympics
Gymnasts at the 1956 Summer Olympics
Sportspeople from the Central Bohemian Region